Dinder is a town in the Sennar state in eastern Sudan. It is within a large loop of the Dinder River, on the western side.

References

Populated places in Sennar (state)